North Ridge may refer to:
 North Ridge (Grand Teton), a climbing route
 North Ridge, Accra, a neighbourhood of Accra, Ghana
 North Ridge, New York, a hamlet in the United States
 North Ridge United Methodist Church, in North Ridge, New York, United States 
 North Ridge Country Club, a neighborhood and golf club in Raleigh, North Carolina, United States